Yuri Leith Fulmer, OBC (born May 5, 1974) is an Australian-born Canadian entrepreneur and philanthropist based in Vancouver, British Columbia. He is a member of the Order of British Columbia (2011), and was awarded the Queen's Diamond Jubilee Medal (2012).

Early life 
Fulmer was born in Perth, Western Australia to a Canadian father and an Australian mother; as a result, he holds dual citizenship. He came to Vancouver in 1992.

Career 
Beginning in 1997, Fulmer worked his way up from drive-through attendant and security escort for A&W (Canada) to a restaurant manager. He  purchased his first A&W restaurant at New Westminster's Royal City Centre. Eventually, his company, FDC Brands, held assets in seven A&W restaurants, 27 Pizza Hut locations in British Columbia and Alberta, and in 2006, he acquired the entire Mr. Mikes Steakhouse and Bar chain.

Fulmer formed Fulmer Capital Partners in 2010, to invest in and mentor small and mid-cap businesses.

Philanthropy 

Fulmer was a recipient of the BC Community Achievement Award (2010) and the Spirit of Vancouver Award (2011) for his contributions to the Vancouver Foundation, the  Surrey Food Bank Society,  Kwantlen Polytechnic University, the Minerva Foundation, the Boys & Girls Clubs, the Vancouver Opera and The United Way of the Lower Mainland.

Fulmer was responsible for raising more than $100 million on behalf of these charitable organizations, including more than $2 million in personal and corporate donations.

In 2008, Fulmer served as General Campaign Chair for United Way of Lower Mainland and Chair of the Board  raising over 30 million dollars that year. In 2017, Fulmer became Chair of the Board of Directors for United Way Centraide Canada.

On June 18, 2020, Fulmer was installed as the fourth Chancellor of Capilano University.

Awards and honours 
 Canada's Top Forty Under 40, 2008
 British Columbia Community Achievement Award, 2010
 Order of British Columbia
 Queen's Diamond Jubilee Medal, 2012 for his contribution to Canadian communities
 The Joseph and Rosalie Community Vision Award, 2014
 Business in Vancouver Living Legends, 2021

References 

1974 births
Living people
Australian emigrants to Canada
Canadian philanthropists
Members of the Order of British Columbia
People from Perth, Western Australia
Businesspeople from Vancouver